Seedlings, is a 2013 Lollywood social drama film directed by Summer Nicks, Meher Jaffri and Mansoor Mujahid and produced by Meher Jaffri and Summer Nicks. The film stars leading Pakistani TV actors Mohib Mirza and Aamina Sheikh. The film was released in Pakistan (Karachi) on 20 September 2013. It also had its world premiere in the United States at the  New York Film Festival.

Plot
The story of Lamha revolves around a happy couple whose lives are changed forever after a devastating accident leaves them reeling for stability.

Cast
Mohib Mirza as Raza
Aamina Sheikh as Maliha
Gohar Rasheed as Anil
Hira Tareen
Tara Mahmood
Mehreen Rafi

Awards
The film premiered in the New York Film Festival and won or was nominated for several awards. It went on to be nominated for many other awards and in various international film festivals across the globe.

References

 http://beta.dawn.com/news/1016026/pakistan-bags-two-awards-at-sri-lankas-saarc-film-festival
 http://www.dailytimes.com.pk/default.asp?page=2013\06\04\story_4-6-2013_pg9_9
 http://tribune.com.pk/story/595895/award-winning-film-lamha-set-to-release-in-pakistan-on-september-20/

External links
 

2013 films
2013 drama films
2010s Urdu-language films
Pakistani drama films
Lollywood films
Pakistani independent films
2013 independent films